Negaverse may refer to:

The home of the evil NegaDuck in the Darkwing Duck series
The Dark Kingdom and its members, the Hell Tree aliens and the Black Moon Clan in the DiC English dub of Sailor Moon.